David Davidson (August 21, 1854 in Stockholm – 1942) was a noted Swedish economist. He was professor of economics and taxation law (then still under its former Swedish designation "finance law") at Uppsala University from 1890 to 1919.

He founded and edited the journal Ekonomisk Tidskrift (known 1965-1975 as the Swedish Journal of Economics, and since 1976 as the Scandinavian Journal of Economics). Via the journal, Davidson has been credited with switching Swedish economic analysis from one that followed the German Historicist approach to one in which Anglo-American style economic theory played a more dominant role. 

His work has been described as Neo-Ricardian. 

Davidson was elected a member of the Royal Swedish Academy of Sciences in 1920.

Major works 
 The Laws of Capital Formation, 1878.
 Contribution to the History of the Theory of Rent, 1880.

References 

Swedish economists
Academic staff of Uppsala University
Members of the Royal Swedish Academy of Sciences
1854 births
1942 deaths